Drastic Plastic is the fifth and final album by English rock band  released in February 1978.

Recording and content 

Nelson recorded the album in  because he was inspired by the relation of the place with artist  who influenced him in the 1960s.

Composition 

The sound of Drastic Plastic is different from the previous albums, showing changes in the musical direction of the band. This sound has been classified as art rock and new wave.

The song  is a song dedicated to Nelson's father, Walter, who died in 1976.

Release 

Drastic Plastic was released in February 1978 by record label Harvest. It was re-released in early 1990 with three bonus tracks while an expanded version appeared in 2021.  

The band split up shortly after releasing the album. That band and album were considered as  Shortly afterwards, Nelson decided to continue his career as soloist, releasing more synthpop albums.

Nelson only maintained  for his  After Be-Bop Deluxe split, bassist  played with other bands in Britain seven more years, returning to his native  in 1985, where he joined reggae band Herbs, continuing his career until his death in 1995.  worked with  formed  and joined  After ,  contributed to selected tracks on  1980 album  and the first two albums by 

Q Magazine described the album as a 'respectable swansong'.

Track listing 
All songs written by Bill Nelson.

"Electrical Language" – 4:50
"New Precision" – 4:30
"New Mysteries" – 4:44
"Surreal Estate" – 5:00
"Love in Flames" – 4:09
"Panic in the World" – 5:04
"Dangerous Stranger" – 3:05
"Superenigmatix (Lethal Appliances for the Home with Everything)" – 2:10
"Visions of Endless Hopes" – 2:23
"Possession" – 2:34
"Islands of the Dead" – 3:45
The U.S. release (SW-11750) dropped "Visions of Endless Hopes" and inserted "Japan" – 2:34

CD reissue bonus tracks
"Blimps" – 2:46
"Lovers Are Mortal" – 4:54
"Lights" – 2:43

Personnel
Bill Nelson - electric, acoustic and 12-string guitars, lead vocals, mandolin, guitar synthesizer, piano, percussion
Andy Clark - keyboards and synthesizers
Charlie Tumahai - bass guitar, backing vocals
Simon Fox - drums, loops

References

External links
Be Bop Deluxe Discography
MySpace: Be Bop Deluxe ('78) MySpace site dedicated to the Drastic Plastic era

1978 albums
Albums produced by John Leckie
Harvest Records albums
Albums with cover art by Hipgnosis
Be-Bop Deluxe albums
New wave albums by English artists